Yes-People is a 2020 Icelandic animated short film written, directed and co-produced by Gísli Darri Halldórsson.

Summary
An eclectic mix of people facing everyday battles one morning.

Voice cast			
Jón Gnarr	
Thor Kristjansson
Helga Braga Jónsdóttir	
Kristján Franklin Magnúss
Ilmur Kristjánsdóttir
Sigurður Sigurjónsson

Accolades
Yes-People was nominated for Best Animated Short Film and the 93rd Academy Awards.

References

External links
Official website
 

Icelandic animated short films
2020 films
2020 animated films
2020 short films